David Wilmot Cheney (April 7, 1859 – September 27, 1913) was a member of the Wisconsin State Assembly.

Biography
Cheney was born on April 7, 1859 in Black River Falls, Wisconsin. His father, David D. Cheney, was also a member of the Assembly. Cheney was involved in the mercantile business and served in what is now the Wisconsin Army National Guard, achieving the rank of captain. He died at his home in Sparta, Wisconsin in 1913.

Political career
Cheney was a member of the Assembly in 1891. Previously, he had been mayor and an alderman of Sparta. He was a Democrat.

References

External links

People from Black River Falls, Wisconsin
People from Sparta, Wisconsin
Democratic Party members of the Wisconsin State Assembly
Mayors of places in Wisconsin
Wisconsin city council members
Military personnel from Wisconsin
National Guard (United States) officers
Businesspeople from Wisconsin
1859 births
1913 deaths
19th-century American businesspeople